The Colorado-Texas Tomato War is an annual event held at Twin Lakes, Lake County, Colorado. It was started in 1982 by local hotel owner Taylor Adams, ended circa 1991, and was revived in 2011.  The event, held in September, pits hundreds of Coloradans and Texans throwing ripe tomatoes at one another, as Coloradans attempted (and generally succeeded) in overrunning an "Alamo" built of straw bales and defended by the outnumbered Texans.

The combatants are identified by souvenir T-shirts sold by Ms. Adams.  The event is based on the rivalry perceived by Coloradans against Texas visitors to the state. It is considered the source for the bumper sticker "Keep Colorado beautiful: put a Texan on a bus." There is a festival located in Colorado annually.

The event was held in 2020-21 despite the COVID-19 pandemic.

References

External links
 Tomato Battle 
 Tomato Wars - A Dirty Business, August 25, 2008, McCook Daily Gazette

History of Colorado